Yeremia Erich Yotje Yacob Rambitan (born 15 October 1999) is an Indonesian badminton player, who also plays for Exist Jakarta in the national event. He won the mixed doubles Junior National Championships title in 2016, and the boys' doubles bronze medal at the World Junior Championships in 2017.

Early and personal life 
Yeremia Erich Yotje Yacob Rambitan, sometimes spelled as Yeremia Erich Yoche Yacob Rambitan, was born on 15 October 1999. He started to playing badminton at the PB Kasih, trained by his father, Timothy Rambitan. In 2015, he entered the Ragunan Sports School under Luluk Hadiyanto, and then was recruited to join the Exist Jakarta team.

Career 
In the junior event, Rambitan managed to claim the 2016 Junior National Championships mixed doubles title partnered with Winny Oktavina Kandow, and led him to join national team in 2017. In September 2017, he won the U-19 mixed doubles title at the Malaysia International Junior Open with Angelica Wiratama. He later took part at the 2017 World Junior Championships, and won the bronze medal in the boys' doubles event with Rinov Rivaldy. 

In 2019, Rambitan reached the final of the International Challenge tournament in Iran with Pramudya Kusumawardana, but was defeated to their compatriots Adnan Maulana and Ghifari Anandaffa Prihardika in straight game. In March, they lost in the second round of 2019 Orléans Masters from Chinese Taipei pair. In July, they lost in the second round of Russian Open from Russian pair Vladimir Ivanov and Ivan Sozonov. In August, they participated in Hyderabad Open in India but lost in the first round. In September, they lost in the second round of Vietnam Open.

In 2020, Rambitan who competed with Kusumawardana lost in the first round of 2020 Spain Masters. Due to the COVID-19 pandemic, numerous tournaments on the 2020 BWF World Tour were either cancelled or rescheduled for later in the year. In June, he participated at the PBSI home tournament and emerged as the men's doubles champions partnered with Fajar Alfian. The duo were unbeaten throughout the competition and out of five matches, they have only lost one game. He also part of Rajawali winning team at the PBSI Thomas Cup simulation.

2021 

In January, Rambitan and Kusumawardana participated in Thailand tour and lost in the first round of 2020 Yonex Thailand Open, and in the second round of 2020 Toyota Thailand Open from the same pair of Mohammad Ahsan and Hendra Setiawan. In March European tour, they lost in the second round of Swiss Open, but took their first tournament victory as a combination in the 2021 Spain Masters, beating fellow Indonesian pair Sabar Karyaman Gutama and Muhammad Reza Pahlevi Isfahani. In October, they reached the second round of 2021 Denmark Open and won the Belgian International beating Muhammad Shohibul Fikri and Bagas Maulana in the final. In November, they lost in the semi-finals of 2021 Hylo Open from fellow Indonesian Leo Rolly Carnando and Daniel Marthin. They participated in the Indonesia Badminton Festival in Bali and reach the quarter-finals of 2021 Indonesia Masters from fellow Indonesian Marcus Fernaldi Gideon and Kevin Sanjaya Sukamuljo. In the next tour, they lost in the second round of 2021 Indonesia Open. They qualified for 2021 BWF World Tour Finals but only managed to book one win and eliminated in group stage.

2022 
In February, Rambitan and Kusumawardana participated in 2022 Badminton Asia Team Championships with Indonesia and lost the title to Malaysia. In March, they participated in European tour and lost in the first round of 2022 All England Open, and reach the semi-finals of Swiss Open. In April, they lost in second round of Korea Open from fellow team mate Muhammad Shohibul Fikri and Bagas Maulana, and the first round of Korea Masters.

In May, Rambitan and Kusumawardana won the 2022 Badminton Asia Championships gold medal in the men's doubles discipline after defeating Malaysian pair Aaron Chia and Soh Wooi Yik, ending Indonesia's 13 year wait for a men's doubles gold medal at the championships, which was won by Hendra Setiawan and Markis Kido. In latter May, he won a silver medal in the men's doubles with Kusumawardana and a bronze medal in the men's team at the Southeast Asian Games. In June, they lost in second round of 2022 Indonesia Masters from fellow team mate Fajar Alfian and Muhammad Rian Ardianto. In the next tour, they lost in the quarter-final of 2022 Indonesia Open in which Rambitan get injured when they just needed one point.

2023 
Rambitan and Kusumawardana back as pair after 6 months recovery and opened the 2023 season at the Malaysia Open, but defeated in the second round to fellow Indonesian pair Mohammad Ahsan and Hendra Setiawan. They competed at the home tournament, Indonesia Masters, but had to lose in the first round from fellow Indonesian pair 1st seeds Fajar Alfian and Muhammad Rian Ardianto. In the next tournament, they lost in the quarter-finals of the Thailand Masters from Chinese Taipei pair Su Ching-heng and Ye Hong-wei.

In February, Rambitan join the Indonesia national badminton team to compete at the Badminton Asia Mixed Team Championships, but unfortunately the teams lost in the quarter-finals from team Korea.

Achievements

Asian Championships 
Men's doubles

Southeast Asian Games 
Men's doubles

World Junior Championships 
Boys' doubles

BWF World Tour (1 title)
The BWF World Tour, which was announced on 19 March 2017 and implemented in 2018, is a series of elite badminton tournaments sanctioned by the Badminton World Federation (BWF). The BWF World Tours are divided into levels of World Tour Finals, Super 1000, Super 750, Super 500, Super 300 (part of the HSBC World Tour), and the BWF Tour Super 100.

Men's doubles

BWF International Challenge/Series (1 title, 1 runner-up) 
Men's doubles

  BWF International Challenge tournament
  BWF International Series tournament

Performance timeline

National team 
 Junior level

 Senior level

Individual competitions

Junior level 
Boys' doubles

Mixed doubles

Senior level

Men's doubles

Mixed doubles

References

External links 
 

1999 births
Living people
Sportspeople from Jakarta
Indonesian male badminton players
Competitors at the 2021 Southeast Asian Games
Southeast Asian Games bronze medalists for Indonesia
Southeast Asian Games medalists in badminton
20th-century Indonesian people
21st-century Indonesian people